The Seguwantivu and Vidatamunai Wind Farms are two legally separate wind farms built together by Seguwantivu Wind Power and Vidatamunai Wind Power, on the south-east shore of the Puttalam Lagoon, in Puttalam, Sri Lanka.

The twelve northern turbines belong to Vidatamunai Wind Farm, while the thirteen southern turbines belong to Seguwantivu. The wind farms cost  to construct.

The transportation of wind turbines from the Colombo Harbour to the wind farm site was carried out by Agility Logistics in late-2009. The erection of each turbine required three cranes; a  lattice crane with a  boom, a  crane, and a  crane, all of which were imported. The wind farms together produces  of electricity annually. A central control station, two indoor switch yards of  each, and an administration building has been built in the Mullipuram Village to support the operations of the wind farm.

See also 

 Electricity in Sri Lanka
 List of power stations in Sri Lanka

References 

Wind farms in Sri Lanka
Buildings and structures in Puttalam District